Rockhurst University Press is a university press affiliated with Rockhurst University, a Jesuit university located in Kansas City, Missouri. The press's bookswhich largely focus on religion, history, and the humanitiesare distributed by Fordham University Press. Rockhurst University Press was a founding member of the Association of Jesuit University Presses.

See also

 List of English-language book publishing companies
 List of university presses

References

External links 
Rockhurst University Press

Rockhurst University Press
Missouri